Henry James Hyne (1867–1936) was an Australian businessman and the mayor of Maryborough, Queensland from 1913 to 1918.

Early life
Henry Hyne was born in 1867 in Queensland, the son of Richard Matthews Hyne and his wife Elizabeth (née Lambert).
Henry Hyne was educated at the Maryborough Grammar School.

Timber industry
He entered his father's sawmill business in 1888. After his father's death in 1902, he took over as general manager and ran the company (Hyne & Son) until 1929.

Politics
He was mayor of the City of Maryborough from 1913 to 1918.

Other
Henry Hyne owned the Ayrshire cattle stud, Coolreagh.

Death
Henry Hyne died in 1936.

References

1867 births
1936 deaths
Mayors of places in Queensland
People from Maryborough, Queensland